Kent Monkman (born 13 November 1965) is a Canadian First Nations artist of Cree ancestry. He is a member of the Fisher River band situated in Manitoba's Interlake Region. Monkman lives and works in Toronto, Ontario.

He works in painting, film/video, and installation. In the early 2000s, Monkman developed his gender-fluid alter ego, Miss Chief Eagle Testickle. 
He has had many solo exhibitions at museums and galleries in Canada, the United States, and Europe. He has achieved international recognition for colourful and richly detailed works that combine genre conventions to recast historical narrative.

Biography
Monkman was born in St. Mary's, Ontario, Canada and raised in Winnipeg, Manitoba. Having art instruction as a youth proved to be a formative experience for Monkman. He later attended various Canadian and US institutions, including the Banff Centre, the Sundance Institute in Los Angeles, and the Canadian Screen Training Institute. He graduated from Oakville's Sheridan College in 1986 (Canadian Art).

Monkman created sets and costumes for several productions for Native Earth Performing Arts including Lady of Silences (1993) by Floyd Favel and Diva Ojibway (1994). 

In 2017, Monkman received the Bonham Centre Award from The Mark S. Bonham Centre for Sexual Diversity Studies, University of Toronto, for his contributions to the advancement of issues around sexual identification. He also accepted the honorary title of grand marshal for Toronto's Pride parade that year, citing the importance of Canada's 150th anniversary and raising awareness of his work.

Curator of the University of Toronto art museum, Barbara Fischer, commissioned Monkman's exhibit, "Shame and Prejudice: A Story of Resilience" to "set up a provocative friction between Canadian national myths, aboriginal experience and traditional European art practices." The exhibit sought to bring the Indigenous experience into the conversation, looking also at what Canada's 150 years meant for Indigenous people.

In 2019, the Metropolitan Museum of Art commissioned two paintings from Monkman for its Great Hall, entitled "mistikôsiwak (Wooden Boat People)." In 2020, the Met acquired the diptych entitled Welcoming the Newcomers (2019) and Resurgence of the People (2019) and published Revision and Resistance: mistikôsiwak (Wooden Boat People) (2020).

Monkman has officially identified both himself and Miss Chief as two-spirit.

Art practice
Monkman's work "convey[s] a deep understanding of oppression and the mechanisms at work in dominant ideology." Through his use of mimicry, Monkman subverts and de-centers the Western Gaze; he makes colonial audiences aware that "you've been looking at us [but] we've also been looking at you". 
He appropriates classical 19th-century landscapes, speaking to the appropriation and assimilation of Indigenous culture by colonial settlers. He targets both the Indigenous communities and Euro-American communities affected by colonialism, generally playing with role reversal to do so. Some of the binaries he tackles are "artist and model, colonial explorer and colonized subject, gazer and gazed upon, male and female, straight and queer, past and present, real and imaginary".

Use of colonizers' images
Monkman’s 2006 Trappers of Men painting takes an 1868 landscape by Albert Bierstadt, but portrays the scene at midday replacing animals with perplexed whites from American art and political history, a Lakota historian, and Monkman's two-spirited alter-ego.

Monkman uses the colonizers' own methodologies, "…to participate in using the Master's language, but his speech subverts rather than upholds the paradigm of oppression". "The artist uses close re-creation of earlier artworks as an opportunity for ironic, often humorous representation of historical attitudes towards First Nations culture, attitudes that persist today".

He is criticized for using mimicry , but he "effect[s] change on a systematic level, to change the signification of the language of oppression, even the minority artist must appeal to a mainstream audience". "Monkman's work might be considered controversial to some, especially in Alberta, where traditional images of the Old West are held near and dear to the heart, but Monkman hopes it helps Albertans see historic representations of colonization under a new light".

Style and method
Monkman adopts the Old Masters style of painting to express emotions like grief and longing. He was particularly moved by Antonio Gisbert's Execution of Torrijos and his Companions on the Beach at Málaga (1888). On a project beginning in 2017, Monkman and his team began working on a "protesters series" based on the Standing Rock protests where they combined photographs from the protest with classic battle scene paintings. Models posed in a classic style with modern subjects; then the photographs were projected on large canvas, traced and base-painted by assistants before Monkman did his finishing touches. He derived Miss Chief's Wet Dream (2018) from two French paintings, The Raft of the Medusa (1818–1819) by Théodore Géricault, and Christ on the Sea of Galilee (1854) by Eugène Delacroix, to evoke Canada’s relationship between Indigenous peoples and colonizers.

Controversy
Kent Monkman's painting Hanky Panky depicts the Prime Minister of Canada, Justin Trudeau, restrained and on all fours with his pants down as Monkman's alter ego, Miss Chief Eagle Testickle, approaches him from behind holding up a red sex toy in the shape of praying hands. Monkman generated controversy by suggesting that the rape scene was a consensual act, but later apologized for "any harm that was caused by the work".

Commentators focused on depicting the Prime Minister that way.

Indigenous critics disparaged Monkman’s view of sexual violence, especially his portrayal of Indigenous women participating in, and even enjoying, voyeuristic rape. Critics said, "Indigenous women and girls in Canada are disproportionately affected by violence."

Moreover, some declared that Monkman incorrectly prioritizes the white-colonialist perspective, "fall[ing] in with a tradition of artists voicing the perspective of Indigenous groups that do not wholly belong to them."

Miss Chief Eagle Testickle
Miss Chief Eagle Testickle is the two-spirit alter ego that Monkman uses as a fierce hunter, an artist, an activist, a seducer, a hero, and a performer. She is also a mythological time traveler, existing during the creation of the world itself as well as in the “colonial spaces [of] the past and present.” 

The ‘Miss Chief’ part of her name is a play on the word ‘mischief’ to reflect Miss Chief's role as the ‘trickster’ in many of Monkman's works. The ‘Eagle Testickle’ sounds like ‘egotistical’, to allude to “what Monkman sees as the egotism of 19th century [Euro-North American] artists.”  As Penny Cousineau-Levine claims, by originally identifying with Cher, “Miss Chief foregrounds her ‘half-breed’ identity... [and] in doing so, distances herself from the historically negative image...”.  

As Dayna Mcleod explains, “Miss Chief's name speaks to (mis)representations of Indigeneity, gender, and sexuality and disrupts all three.”

Origins of Miss Chief 
Miss Chief appears out-of-place with her contemporary appearance and 'diva-esque' personality in the 19th century as well as “an anachronism, an element of the past bleeding into the present.”

Monkman was interested in colonial artists who documented “highly idealized representations of Canadian [Indigenous] peoples as noble savages.” According to Katherine Brooks, these depictions “sought to ‘freeze’ [Indigenous peoples] in these idealized, yet lost times...” Monkman was interested in the “subjective position of the artists who produce Western American wild frontier paintings”. According to Braden Lee Scott, early colonial artists “wanted to depict ‘pristine landscapes of Canada’ that were ‘void of reference to native peoples’.”

Monkman incorporated Miss Chief to “steadily erode the authority of the ‘originals’.” Jonathan Katz argues that Monkman is concerned with the “telling of the past, as opposed to the past itself.” Monkman claims that Miss Chief originated out of “needing someone within that time period”. As suggested by Kate and Linda Morris, by her very nature, Miss Chief “...refuses to be frozen in time.”

Monkman claims that his inspiration for creating Miss Chief was George Catlin's painting Dance to the Berdash, 1835-1837 In response to both the painting and Catlin's remarks about traditional Indigenous conceptions of gender and sexuality, Monkman was “prompted to incorporate a persona in his paintings that would embrace gender and sexuality, honouring the tradition of the two-spirit in Indigenous societies...” Monkman “wanted to create an artistic persona that could rival that of Catlin.”

As Monkman states, Miss Chief helps him “lighten how [he] treats sometimes very dark subject matter because [he's] looking at effectively a genocide.”

Portrait of the Artist as Hunter           
In Portrait of The Artist as Hunter, 2002, an acrylic painting depicts Miss Chief hunting while riding bare-back on a white stallion in a background that is “the rolling landscape of the Great Plains...”, Monkman appropriates John Mix Stanley’s painting Buffalo Hunt, 1845 that uses “the image of the [Indigenous] male and presents him as a mysterious, exotic figure; the subject of romanticized notions of the Noble Savage...” while the cowboy’s exposed bottom is “a sign that he is to be dominated by his pursuant” and “his desirability and vulnerability to sexual contact”.

Two-Spiritedness and Queerness 
Miss Chief possesses an idealized masculine body to challenge 19th century  depictions of two-spirited people as ‘slaves’, or ‘inferior’. Furthermore, Miss Chief's two-spirit identity “is an assertion that... the values of settler communities have not entirely succeeded in suppressing the sexual and gender mores of [Indigenous] communities...”

According to Roland, 19th century men depicted Indigenous men as “full of primitive strength, savage courage, and uncivilized passions.” By combining this masculinity with contemporary drag makeup and queerness, Miss Chief subverts contemporary constructions of masculinity and Indigeneity that are based on dominant historical narratives.

Monkman “indigenizes history, by making history and gender more fluid concepts.” Miss Chief shows that “the contemporary view [of Indigeneity and two-spiritedness] is incomprehensible without the past... we ourselves are still inhabited by these historical ideas and images.” Contemporary theorist Elizabeth Freeman suggests, “asynchrony can be viewed as a queer phenomenon.”

Iconography and Fashion 
Reilley Bishop-Stall suggests that Miss Chief's conflation of the customs and traditional wear of distinct Indigenous nations with Settler clothing fetishizes depictions of Indigeneity in historical Western art and contemporary pop-culture.

As Miss Chief herself stated during her performance of Seance at the Royal Ontario Museum in October 2007, artist Paul Kane “...always told me I wasn't authentic enough, as I was constantly traveling back and forth from Europe and always came back with the latest fashions.” According to Miss Chief, Kane didn't see her “as an authentic Aboriginal.” As Alla Myzelev explains, Miss Chief “blurs the accepted boundaries between... authentic and inauthentic cultural formations.”

Miss Chief as ‘Trickster' 
In many traditional Indigenous teachings, the Trickster is a  supernatural mischievous being often depicted defying social order.

Miss Chief is “a trickster, undefinable, fluid, charming, upsetting, silly, playful, revealing.” She is able to travel between oppositions that “structure life in North America” by undermining polarities between “the past and present, [the] resistant and the complicit... [the] authentic and the degraded.”

Despite the violence and brutality of her actions in many of Monkman's works, the irony of the depicted scenes may be humorous. As literary critic Eva Gruber explains, many native artists and authors ironically “engage with the representational tropes [of Indigeneity], very nearly reproducing them in order to subvert and expose them as false constructions.”

The role of Miss Chief as a trickster in Monkman's works, also alludes to “the tricks Monkman has played on the viewer in the painting.” As Shirley Madill argues, Miss Chief's ability to “reverse the gaze of colonizers” tricks audiences into engaging with a history that is as equally fabricated as the histories depicted in historical documents and Western art that many people would consider to be ‘objective’. In Monkman's works, Miss Chief's dominant position and her “commanding presence shows [historical] documents to be the fantasies they truly are.”

Group of Seven Inches 
While Monkman was artist-in-residence at the McMichael Gallery in Vaughan, Ontario, the gallery looped Edward Curtis’ film In the Land of the Headhunters, 1914 that purports to document “…the last remains of ‘authentic Indigeneity...”

In 2005, Monkman performed The Taxonomy of The European Male, “which was later followed by a separate shooting session of Taxonomy.” The content from that session was edited into the film Group of Seven Inches.

Pauline Wakeham argues Settlers were the “preservers and the predators of the ‘vanishing race.’”

Awards
 Indspire Award (2014)
 Premier's Award for Excellence in the Arts (2017)

References

Further reading
 Madill, Shirley. Kent Monkman: Life & Work. Toronto: Art Canada Institute, 2022. ISBN 978-1-4871-0280-7 
 Astrid M. Fellner: Camping Indigeneity. The Queer Politics of Kent Monkman. In: The Dark Side of Camp Aesthetics. Queer Economy of Dust, Dirt, and Patina. Ed. Ingrid HotzDavis, Georg Vogt, Franziska Bergmann. Routledge, New York 2017, pp 156– 176
Brandon, Laura. War Art in Canada: A Critical History. Toronto: Art Canada Institute, 2021. ISBN 978-1-4871-0271-5
Monkman, Kent. Revision and Resistance: mistikôsiwak (Wooden Boat People) at The Metropolitan Museum of Art. Toronto: Art Canada Institute, 2020. ISBN 9781487102258
Scott, Braden Lee. "Pornoarchaeology of Kent Monkman's Group of Seven Inches." Porn Studies 8, no. 3 (2021): 296-313.

External links
 
"Introducing Miss Chief" by Shirley Madill, an excerpt from Revision and Resistance: mistikôsiwak (Wooden Boat People) at The Metropolitan Museum of Art, published by the Art Canada Institute
"A Practice of Recovery" by Sasha Suda, an excerpt from Revision and Resistance: mistikôsiwak (Wooden Boat People) at The Metropolitan Museum of Art, published by the Art Canada Institute
"Decolonizing History Painting" by Ruth B. Phillips and Mark Salber Phillips, an excerpt from Revision and Resistance: mistikôsiwak (Wooden Boat People) at The Metropolitan Museum of Art, published by the Art Canada Institute
"A Vision for the Future" by Nick Estes, an excerpt from Revision and Resistance: mistikôsiwak (Wooden Boat People) at The Metropolitan Museum of Art, published by the Art Canada Institute
"Inside Kent Monkman's Studio" by Jami C. Powell, an excerpt from Revision and Resistance: mistikôsiwak (Wooden Boat People) at The Metropolitan Museum of Art, published by the Art Canada Institute
 Kent Monkman at the National Gallery of Canada
 "Historic Drag - Kent Monkman's new show redresses colonial art" and "The Alternative Realism of Kent Monkman - A virtuoso paints Indigenous life into Canadian history" in The Walrus Magazine
 Works by Kent Monkman at Pierre François Ouellette art contemporain, Montréal (PFOAC)

1965 births
Living people
Artists from Ontario
Artists from Winnipeg
Canadian drag queens
Canadian people of Irish descent
Cree people
First Nations installation artists
First Nations filmmakers
First Nations painters
First Nations performance artists
First Nations photographers
Canadian LGBT artists
LGBT First Nations people
Indspire Awards
People from St. Mary's, Ontario
Two-spirit people
21st-century Canadian painters
Canadian male painters
21st-century Canadian photographers
Non-binary drag performers
LGBT photographers
21st-century Canadian male artists
Sheridan College alumni
21st-century Canadian LGBT people